Sameh Youssef (born 1 February 1978), is an Egyptian former professional footballer who played for Mokaweloon and Zamalek as a centre forward.

Honours
Zamalek
Egyptian Premier League:
 2003-04
Arab Champions Cup:
 2003
Saudi-Egyptian Super Cup:
 2003

References

1978 births
Al Mokawloon Al Arab SC players
Zamalek SC players
Al Ittihad Alexandria Club players
Egyptian footballers
Living people
Egyptian Premier League players
Association football forwards